The School of Violin Making, Newark is housed in a Grade II listed building on Kirkgate, Newark on Trent which was built for the Nottingham and Nottinghamshire Bank in 1887.

History
The Nottingham and Nottinghamshire Bank first established a branch in Newark in 1835 branch but this was replaced by a new building designed by the architect Watson Fothergill and erected between 1886 and 1887. It is in early Italian Gothic style and incorporates a manager's house. In 1891 the bank suffered an embarrassment when it was revealed that the manager of the Newark branch, Robert James Beard, had defrauded the bank of £25,000 before drowning himself in the River Trent. The bank covered the loss from its reserves.

It became the London, County, Westminster & Parr's Bank in 1919. The tower was reduced in height in 1957.

School of Violin Making
Around 1972 the building was surplus to requirements and was converted for the use of the School of Violin Making. This is now part of Lincoln College, Lincolnshire.

References

Grade II listed buildings in Nottinghamshire
Buildings and structures completed in 1887
Newark-on-Trent
Bowed string instrument makers